An Euler spiral is a curve whose curvature changes linearly with its curve length (the curvature of a circular curve is equal to the reciprocal of the radius). Euler spirals are also commonly referred to as spiros, clothoids, or Cornu spirals.

Euler spirals have applications to diffraction computations. They are also widely used in railway and highway engineering to design transition curves between straight and curved sections of railway or roads. A similar application is also found in photonic integrated circuits. The principle of linear variation of the curvature of the transition curve between a tangent and a circular curve defines the geometry of the Euler spiral: 
Its curvature begins with zero at the straight section (the tangent) and increases linearly with its curve length.
Where the Euler spiral meets the circular curve, its curvature becomes equal to that of the latter.

Applications

Track transition curve

To travel along a circular path, an object needs to be subject to a centripetal acceleration (for example: the Moon circles around the Earth because of gravity; a car turns its front wheels inward to generate a centripetal force). If a vehicle traveling on a straight path were to suddenly transition to a tangential circular path, it would require centripetal acceleration suddenly switching at the tangent point from zero to the required value; this would be difficult to achieve (think of a driver instantly moving the steering wheel from straight line to turning position, and the car actually doing it), putting mechanical stress on the vehicle's parts, and causing much discomfort (due to lateral jerk).

On early railroads this instant application of lateral force was not an issue since low speeds and wide-radius curves were employed (lateral forces on the passengers and the lateral sway was small and tolerable). As speeds of rail vehicles increased over the years, it became obvious that an easement is necessary, so that the centripetal acceleration increases linearly with the traveled distance. Given the expression of centripetal acceleration , the obvious solution is to provide an easement curve whose curvature, increases linearly with the traveled distance. This geometry is an Euler spiral.

Unaware of the solution of the geometry by Leonhard Euler, Rankine cited the cubic curve (a polynomial curve of degree 3), which is an approximation of the Euler spiral for small angular changes in the same way that a parabola is an approximation to a circular curve.

Marie Alfred Cornu (and later some civil engineers) also solved the calculus of the Euler spiral independently. Euler spirals are now widely used in rail and highway engineering for providing a transition or an easement between a tangent and a horizontal circular curve.

Optics

The Cornu  spiral can be used to describe a diffraction pattern.
Then the diffracted wave field can be expressed as

where  is the Fresnel integral function, which forms the Cornu spiral on the complex plane.

This facilitates a rough computation of the attenuation of the plane wave by the knife edge of height  at a location  beyond the knife edge.

Integrated optics 
Bends with continuously varying radius of curvature following the Euler spiral are also used to reduce losses in photonic integrated circuits, either in singlemode waveguides, to smoothen the abrupt change of curvature and suppress coupling to radiation modes, or in multimode waveguides, in order to suppress coupling to higher order modes and ensure effective singlemode operation.
A pioneering and very elegant application of the Euler spiral to waveguides had been made as early as 1957, with a hollow metal waveguide for microwaves. There the idea was to exploit the fact that a straight metal waveguide can be physically bent to naturally take a gradual bend shape resembling an Euler spiral.

Auto racing 
Motorsport author Adam Brouillard has shown the Euler spiral's use in optimizing the racing line during the corner entry portion of a turn.

Typography and digital vector drawing 
Raph Levien has released Spiro as a toolkit for curve design, especially font design, in 2007 under a free licence. This toolkit has been implemented quite quickly afterwards in the font design tool Fontforge and the digital vector drawing Inkscape.

Map projection 
Cutting a sphere along a spiral with width  and flattening out the resulting shape yields an Euler spiral when  tends to the infinity. If the sphere is the globe, this produces a map projection whose distortion tends to zero as  tends to the infinity.

Whisker shapes 
Natural shapes of rat's mystacial pad vibrissae (whiskers) are well approximated by pieces of the Euler spiral.  When all these pieces for a single rat are assembled together, they span an interval extending from one coiled domain of the Euler spiral to the other.

Formulation

Symbols

Expansion of Fresnel integral

If , which is the case for normalized Euler curve, then the Cartesian coordinates are given by Fresnel integrals (or Euler integrals):

Normalization and conclusion 

For a given Euler curve with:

or

then

where

 Find  from the Fresnel integrals; and
Note that .

In the normalization process,

Then

Generally the normalization reduces  to a small value (less than 1) and results in good converging characteristics of the Fresnel integral manageable with only a few terms (at a price of increased numerical instability of the calculation, especially for bigger  values.).

Illustration 
Given:

Then

and

and

The two angles  are the same. This thus confirms that the original and normalized Euler spirals are geometrically similar. The locus of the normalized curve can be determined from Fresnel Integral, while the locus of the original Euler spiral can be obtained by scaling up or denormalizing.

Other properties of normalized Euler spirals

Normalized Euler spirals can be expressed as:

or expressed as power series:

The normalized Euler spiral will converge to a single point in the limit as the parameter L approaches infinity, which can be expressed as:

Normalized Euler spirals have the following properties:

and

Note that  also means , in agreement with the last mathematical statement.

See also 
 Archimedean spiral
 Fresnel integral
 Geometric design of roads
 List of spirals
 Track transition curve

References

Notes

Sources

Further reading

R. Nave, The Cornu spiral, Hyperphysics (2002) (Uses πt²/2 instead of t².)
 Milton Abramowitz and Irene A. Stegun, eds. Handbook of Mathematical Functions with Formulas, Graphs, and Mathematical Tables. New York: Dover, 1972. (See Chapter 7)

External links 
 Euler's spiral at 2-D Mathematical Curves
 Interactive example with JSXGraph
Euler's spiral-based map projection

Transportation engineering
Calculus
Plane curves
Spirals